The 9th (Secunderabad) Division  was an infantry division formation of the British Indian Army. It was part of the Southern Army and was formed in 1904 after Lord Kitchener was appointed Commander-in-Chief, India between 1902 and 1909. He instituted large-scale reforms, including merging the three armies of the Presidencies into a unified force and forming higher level formations, eight army divisions, and brigading Indian and British units. Following Kitchener's reforms, the British Indian Army became "the force recruited locally and permanently based in India, together with its expatriate British officers."

The Division remained in India on internal security duties during World War I, but some of its brigades were transferred to serve with other units. The 9th (Secunderabad) Cavalry Brigade traveled to France and served on the Western Front as part of the 2nd Indian Cavalry Division.  The 27th (Bangalore) Brigade served in East Africa as part of the Indian Expeditionary Force B.  Force B was broken up in December 1914 and its units used for the defence of East Africa.

Composition in 1914
At the outbreak of the First World War in August 1914, the division was commanded by Major-General A. Phayre and had the following composition:

Secunderabad Cavalry Brigade

Commander: Brigadier-General F.W.G. Wadeson
 7th (Princess Royal's) Dragoon Guards
 7th (Queen's Own) Hussars remained in Secunderabad
 20th Deccan Horse
 26th King George’s Own Light Cavalry remained in Secunderabad
 34th Prince Albert Victor's Own Poona Horse
 Signal Troop

1st Secunderabad Infantry Brigade
Commander: Major-General P.S. Wilkinson
 2nd Battalion, King's (Shropshire Light Infantry)
 1st Brahmans
 88th Carnatic Infantry
 94th Russell's Infantry
 XIX Brigade, Royal Field Artillery

2nd Secunderabad Infantry Brigade
Commander: Brigadier-General E.H. Rodwell
 1st Battalion, Royal Inniskilling Fusiliers
 6th Jat Light Infantry
 83rd Wallajahbad Light Infantry
 XIII Brigade, Royal Field Artillery

Bangalore Brigade

Commander: Brigadier-General Richard Wapshare
 2nd Battalion, Loyal North Lancashire Regiment
 61st Pioneers
 101st Grenadiers
 108th Infantry
 IV Brigade, Royal Field Artillery
The brigade was reformed as 27th (Bangalore) Brigade and joined Indian Expeditionary Force B for service in British East Africa.  The formation was:
 2nd Battalion, Loyal North Lancashire Regiment
 63rd Palamcottah Light Infantry
 98th Infantry
 101st Grenadiers

Southern Brigade
Commander: Brigadier-General W.G. Hamilton
 2nd Battalion, Buffs (East Kent Regiment)
 1st Battalion, Royal Dublin Fusiliers
 73rd Carnatic Infantry
 75th Carnatic Infantry
 86th Carnatic Infantry
 IX Brigade, Royal Horse Artillery

Engineers
 9th Field Company, 2nd Queen Victoria's Own Madras Miners and Sappers
 10th Field Company, 2nd Queen Victoria's Own Madras Miners and Sappers
 11th Field Company, 2nd Queen Victoria's Own Madras Miners and Sappers
 12th Field Company, 2nd Queen Victoria's Own Madras Miners and Sappers

See also

 List of Indian divisions in World War I

References

Bibliography

External links

British Indian Army divisions
Indian World War I divisions
Military units and formations established in 1904
Military units and formations disestablished in 1922